John Madison Davy (June 29, 1835 – April 21, 1909) was a U.S. Representative from New York.

Born in Bytown in Upper Canada (now known as Ottawa, Ontario), Davy moved to New York with his parents, who settled near Rochester, Monroe County, in 1835.
He attended the common schools and the Monroe Academy, East Henrietta, New York.
He served in the Union Army during the Civil War as a first lieutenant in Company G, One Hundred and Eighth Regiment, Volunteer Infantry, in 1862 and 1863.
He studied law in Rochester.
He was admitted to the bar in 1863 and commenced practice in Rochester, New York.
He served as district attorney of Monroe County 1868-1872.
He served as collector of customs for the port of Genesee from 1872 until his resignation in 1875.

Davy was elected as a Republican to the Forty-fourth Congress (March 4, 1875 – March 3, 1877).
He was an unsuccessful candidate for reelection in 1876 to the Forty-fifth Congress.
He resumed the practice of law.

Davy was elected justice of the supreme court of New York and served from January 1, 1889, until his retirement in 1905.
He again resumed the practice of law.
He died in Atlantic City, New Jersey, April 21, 1909.
He was interred in Mount Hope Cemetery, Rochester, New York.

References

1835 births
1909 deaths
Union Army officers
Republican Party members of the United States House of Representatives from New York (state)
19th-century American politicians
County district attorneys in New York (state)